Greece competed at the 1988 Summer Paralympics in Seoul, South Korea. 4 competitors from Greece won 4 medals, 1 silver and 3 bronze and finished 44th in the medal table.

Medalists

See also 
 Greece at the Paralympics
 Greece at the 1988 Summer Olympics

References 

1988
1988 in Greek sport
Nations at the 1988 Summer Paralympics